Bibiani Gold Stars FC, formerly the Complex Stars and often shortened to and more commonly known as the Gold Stars, is a Ghanaian professional football team based in the Western North Region. It was founded in 1998 and later given to the Bibiani Gold Mines, who play in the 2A Zone of the Ghana Premier League . Zone 2A has seven competing teams from the part of the Ashanti Region, Western Region and the Central Region of Ghana.

Managerial history 

 Agyemang Duah (2013)
 Kobina Amissah (2020–21)
 Michael Osei (2021–)

References

 

Football clubs in Ghana
Association football clubs established in 1998
1998 establishments in Ghana
Western North Region